The participation of Malaysia in the ABU TV Song Festival has occurred six times since the inaugural ABU TV Song Festival began in 2012. Since their début in 2012, the Malaysian entry has been organised by the national broadcaster Radio Televisyen Malaysia (RTM).

History
RTM is one of the founder members in the ABU TV Song Festivals, having participated in the very first ABU TV Song Festival 2012.

Withdrawal
On 2 June 2014, Radio Televisyen Malaysia (RTM) announced that Malaysia withdrew from the ABU TV Song Festival 2014, for a year-break.

Return
On 19 August 2015 it was announced that Malaysia would be one of 14 countries participating in the 2015 ABU TV Song Festival in Istanbul, Turkey. On 13 September it was revealed that Malaysia would be represented by Ernie Zakri, three days later on 13 September Ernie's song was announced as "Dialah di Hati".

Participation overview 
 Did not compete or was relegated

References 

Countries at the ABU Song Festival